Clouds of Smoke (Nubes de humo) is a 1959 Argentine musical (tango) comedy film directed and written by Enrique Carreras.
It stars tango singer Alberto Castillo, Mercedes Carreras, María Luisa Santés and Francisco Álvarez and was released on 14 May 1959. The film, Castillo's last, is dedicated to the memory of film director Manuel Romero.

Plot
An amateur tango student who gave up singing when he finished his degree, relapses.

Cast
  Alberto Castillo
  Mercedes Carreras
  María Luisa Santés
  Francisco Álvarez
  Alberto Bello
  Nélida Lobato
  Eber Lobato
  Francisco Canaro
  Héctor Armendáriz
  Mario Baroffio
  Susana Rubio
  Juan Villarreal
  Elvira Joaquina Rodrígues Lima

Music
The music for the film was composed by Vlady. Alberto Castillo sings songs such as "Así se baila el tango". Archivo de la Filmoteca notes that the film fused together influences of Tango and rumba with rock and roll and that Carreras's films "combine new rhythms and incorporate young generations".

Reception 
Tulio Carella said in Crítica: "A long story is told in Nubes de humo. The film is minor and poorly plotted. It does, however, offer a few moments of excitement and some not-too-old-fashioned jokes." Jorge Miguel Couselo opined in Correo de la Tarde that it was "another tawdry film". Raúl Manrupe and María Alejandra Portela in their book Un diccionario de films argentinos (1930–1995) wrote (translated from Spanish): "Crepuscular title of a kind of cinema which tends towards more pop (there's a scene with rock and roll music) and which repeats scenes in a framework of falsehood."

References

External links
 

1959 films
1950s Spanish-language films
Argentine black-and-white films
1950s Argentine films
Films directed by Enrique Carreras
Tango films
1959 musical comedy films
Argentine musical comedy films